{{Taxobox
| name = Enhydrobacter
| domain = Bacteria
| phylum = Pseudomonadota
| classis = Gammaproteobacteria
| ordo = Pseudomonadales
| familia = Moraxellaceae
| genus = Enhydrobacter
| genus_authority = Staley et al. 1987
| type_species = Enhydrobacter aerosaccus
| subdivision_ranks = Species
| subdivision = Enhydrobacter aerosaccus}}Enhydrobacter is a genus of bacteria which belongs to the class Alphaproteobacteria. So far, only one species is known (Enhydrobacter aerosaccus). Enhydrobacter has been discussed to be reclassified to the  family Rhodospirillaceae and the class  Alphaproteobacteria. Because of its oxidase positive it can not be placed in the family Enterobacteriaceae'' as it is not a parasite of birds or mammals.

References

	

Moraxellaceae
Monotypic bacteria genera
Bacteria genera